Tina Karwasky (born November 24, 1952) is a former professional tennis player from the United States.

Born Tina Watanabe, she is of Japanese descent. She competed during her career under her married name Tina Mochizuki.

Biography
Karwasky, who grew up in Los Angeles, played collegiate tennis for California State University, Los Angeles (Cal State LA) in the 1970s.

As a professional player she had a best ranking of 88 in the world and appeared regularly in the main draws of all grand slam tournaments. Her match wins on the WTA Tour include Lisa Bonder, Dianne Fromholtz, Bonnie Gadusek and Kathy Rinaldi.

Later returning to Cal State LA, she was the school's tennis coach for 21 seasons.

References

External links
 
 

1952 births
Living people
American female tennis players
Tennis players from Los Angeles
American sportspeople of Japanese descent
California State University, Los Angeles alumni
California State University, Los Angeles faculty
21st-century American women